The Wounded Man is an 1844–1854 self-portrait by Gustave Courbet. Courbet is painted himself in a romantic theme as a suffering heroic man. Originally, there was a woman leaning on the artist's shoulder. She has been replaced by a sword at the end of a love affair, in 1854. He also added a red bloodstain on his shirt. That creates a contrast, because the calm face expression isn't reflecting his bleeding.

References

External links
 Musee d'Orsay page on The Wounded Man

Paintings in the collection of the Musée d'Orsay
Paintings by Gustave Courbet
Self-portraits